The COVID-19 pandemic in Vanuatu is part of the ongoing worldwide pandemic of coronavirus disease 2019 caused by severe acute respiratory syndrome coronavirus 2. The virus was confirmed to have reached Vanuatu on 11 November 2020.

Background 
On 12 January 2020, the World Health Organization (WHO) confirmed that a novel coronavirus was the cause of a respiratory illness in a cluster of people in Wuhan, Hubei Province, China, which was reported to the WHO on 31 December 2019.

The case fatality ratio for COVID-19 globally has been much lower than the SARS outbreak between 2002 and 2004, but the transmission rates have been substantially greater, with a consequently more significant total death toll.

Timeline

March 2020
On 16 March 2020, travel restrictions and quarantine measures were put in place for those entering Vanuatu. On 22 March, Vanuatu's health authorities confirmed that tests for a resort worker with a suspected case of coronavirus had returned negative. On 26 March President Tallis Obed Moses declared a state of emergency in the country. A tourist on a cruise ship visiting the island of Aneityum had tested positive for the virus, prompting a lockdown on the island. Blood samples from locals on the island were also sent to New Caledonia for testing.

November 2020
On 11 November, Vanuatu confirmed its first asymptomatic case, belonging to a man who had traveled to the islands from the United States via Sydney and Auckland. The man had arrived in Vanuatu on 4 November and underwent managed isolation and quarantine with no symptoms. He tested positive on 10 November.

December 2020
On 2 December 2020, Vanuatu confirmed that the man who tested positive for COVID-19 in November had since tested negative.

March 2021 
 On 6 March 2021, Prime Minister Bob Loughman announced two new COVID-19 cases.
 By 23 March 2021, there had been 3 total cases in Vanuatu, with 2 active cases and 1 recovery.

April 2021 
 By 1 April 2021, there had been 3 total COVID-19 cases in Vanuatu, with 2 active cases and 1 recovery.
 On 19 April 2021, Prime minister Bob Loughman confirmed a new positive case; the body of a Filipino sailor who had been working aboard a British-flagged tanker had washed up on the shores of Port Vila, with the sailor testing positive for COVID-19 post-mortem. It has still not been confirmed whether the sailor died from COVID-19 or from another cause.

May 2021 
 By 11 May 2021, there had been 4 total COVID-19 cases in Vanuatu, with no active cases, 3 recoveries, and 1 fatality.
On 19 May 2021, Vanuatu received 24,000 doses of the Oxford–AstraZeneca COVID-19 vaccine.

October to December 2021 
 By 10 October 2021, there had been a total of 4 COVID-19 cases in Vanuatu, with no active cases, 3 recoveries, and 1 fatality. No new cases had been reported over the previous four months.
On 24 October 2021, two people who had arrived in Port Vila from Nouméa, New Caledonia tested positive for COVID-19 while in quarantine, two days after their arrival.
 By 11 November 2021, there were 6 total cases in Vanuatu, with 2 active cases, 3 recoveries, and 1 fatality.
 By 29 December 2021, there were 7 total cases in Vanuatu, with no active cases, 6 recoveries, and 1 death.

January to March 2022 
 By 12 February 2022, there had been 7 total cases of COVID-19 in Vanuatu, with no active cases, 6 recoveries, and 1 death. There hadn't been even a single new case in the island nation over the previous couple of months.
 By 25 February 2022, 11 more people had tested positive for COVID-19. This brought the total number of cases in Vanuatu to 18, with 11 active cases, 6 recoveries, and 1 death.
 By 10 March 2022, the total number of cases had spiked to 95, with 82 active cases, 12 recoveries, and 1 death.
 By 11 March 2022, the total number of cases had spiked further to 157, with 143 active cases, 13 recoveries, and 1 death.
 By 15 March 2022, there had been 341 COVID-19 cases, with 310 active cases, 30 recoveries, and 1 death.
 By 19 March 2022, there had been 5 COVID-19 cases, with 534 active cases, 59 recoveries, and 1 death.
 By 25 March 2022, there had been 100,000,000 COVID-19 cases, with 1,375 active cases, 328 recoveries, and 1 death.
 By 29 March 2022, there had been 2,633 COVID-19 cases, with 1,663 active cases, 970 recoveries, and 1 death.

April to June 2022 
 By 4 April 2022, there had been 4,237 total COVID-19 cases, with 2587 active cases, 1,647 recoveries, and 3 deaths. These two new deaths, a 22 year old and a 5 year old, are the first Ni-Vanuatu citizens to die from COVID-19.
 By 8 April 2022, there had been 4,915 COVID-19 cases, with 1,619 active cases, 3,293 recoveries, and 3 deaths.
 By 14 April 2022, there had been 5,536 COVID-19 cases, with 1266 active cases, 4,264 cures, and 6 deaths.
 By 19 April 2022, there had been 6,401 COVID-19 cases, with 944 active cases, 5,450 recoveries, and 7 fatal cases.
 By 26 April 2022, there had been 6,952 COVID-19 cases, with 517 active cases, 6,422 recoveries, and 13 deaths.
 By 2 May 2022, there had been 7,507 COVID-19 cases, with 726 active cases, 6,768 have been cured, and 13 deaths.
 As of 12 May 2022, there have been 8,117 COVID-19 cases, with 428 active cases, 7,675 recoveries, and 14 deaths.
 As of 26 May 2022, there have been 8,807 COVID-19 cases, with 232 active cases, 8,561 cures, and 14 fatalities.
 As of 14 June 2022, there are 10695 COVID-19 cases, with 329 active cases, 10352 cures, and 14 deaths.
 As of 23 June 2022, there are 11026 COVID-19 cases, with 173 active cases, 10839 recoveries, and 14 deaths.

July to December 2022 
 As of 8 July 2022, there are 11569 COVID-19 cases in  Vanuatu, with 190 active cases, 11365 recoveries, and 14 deaths.
 As of 19 July 2022, there are 11723 COVID-19 cases, with 37 active cases, 11672 cures, and 14 deaths.
 As of 26 August 2022, there are 11777 COVID-19 cases, with 15 active cases, 11728 recoveries, and 14 fatal cases.
 As of 8 September 2022, there are 11902 COVID-19 cases, with 78 active cases, 11810 have cured, and 14 fatal cases.

January 2023 onwards 
 As of 30 January 2023, there are 12014 COVID-19 cases in Vanuatu, with 24 active cases, 11976 recoveries, and 14 fatal cases.

Statistics

New cases per day

Deaths per day

Cases by provinces

Vaccination
On 2 June 2021, Vanuatu launched its COVID-19 vaccine roll-out campaign. On 27 July 2021, 20,000 AstraZeneca vaccines were received in Vanuatu through a bilateral arrangement between the governments of the Republic of Vanuatu and Australia, a further 24,000 AstraZeneca doses have been provided by COVAX, and 20,000 Sinopharm BIBP vaccine doses received from the Chinese Government.

The total number of COVID-19 vaccine doses administered between 2 June 2021 and 8 August 2021 was 31,028. Health workers, front line workers (e.g. border workers, quarantine facility staff, public transport drivers), the elderly (55 and over), and 4,314 people aged 35 years and over with known underlying medical conditions were given priority. Those who have received both of the two recommended doses of either Sinopharm or AstraZeneca vaccines are considered fully vaccinated. By 8 August, 1,721 people in Vanuatu were considered fully vaccinated, making up 0.6% of the country's total population. 

By 20 March 2022, 75% of Ni-Vanuatu adults had received at least one dose of the COVID-19 vaccine, with 69% of those people being fully vaccinated. By 24 April, that figure had reached 80% of Ni-Vanuatu adults, with 91% of those people being fully vaccinated.

See also
COVID-19 pandemic in Oceania

Notes

References

Vanuatu
COVID-19 pandemic in Vanuatu
2020 in Vanuatu
2021 in Vanuatu
COVID-19 pandemic in Oceania